Bernhardt Creek is a stream in Lane County, Oregon, in the United States. The creek was named for the Bernhardt family of early settlers.

See also
List of rivers of Oregon

References

Rivers of Lane County, Oregon
Rivers of Oregon